Björn Axel Göte Nordqvist (born 6 October 1942) is a Swedish former professional footballer who played as a defender.

Career 
During the 1960s and 1970s Nordqvist was captain of the Sweden national team. He played at the 1970 FIFA World Cup, 1974 FIFA World Cup and 1978 FIFA World Cup and in total won 115 international caps, which was a world record at the time. Nordqvist was the most capped Swedish player until Thomas Ravelli overtook by playing his 116th game for Sweden at the semi-finals of the 1994 FIFA World Cup.
 
At club level, Nordqvist won the Swedish title with IFK Norrköping and also won Dutch league and cup winners medals with PSV Eindhoven. He was awarded the Guldbollen as Swedish footballer of the year in 1968 and was later inducted to the Hall of Fame of Swedish football.

Nordqvist also played ice hockey and bandy on a national level.

See also
List of footballers with 100 or more caps

References

External links
NASL Stats

1942 births
Living people
People from Hallsberg Municipality
Swedish footballers
Association football defenders
Allsvenskan players
Eredivisie players
IFK Göteborg players
PSV Eindhoven players
Landskrona BoIS players
IFK Norrköping players
Örgryte IS players
Sweden international footballers
1970 FIFA World Cup players
1974 FIFA World Cup players
1978 FIFA World Cup players
North American Soccer League (1968–1984) indoor players
North American Soccer League (1968–1984) players
Minnesota Kicks players
FIFA Century Club
Swedish expatriate footballers
Swedish expatriate sportspeople in the Netherlands
Expatriate footballers in the Netherlands
Swedish expatriate sportspeople in the United States
Expatriate soccer players in the United States
Sportspeople from Örebro County